Jim Osborne (born February 1, 1945) is a former professional tennis player from the United States. He enjoyed most of his tennis success while playing doubles. During his career. he won five doubles titles, and won an Olympic Bronze medal in doubles tennis.

Career finals

Doubles (7 titles, 3 runner-ups)

External links
 
 

American male tennis players
Sportspeople from Honolulu
Tennis people from Hawaii
1945 births
Living people